Francisco de la Torre Prados (born 21 December 1942) is a Spanish People's Party (PP) politician who has been the mayor of Málaga since 2000. He has also been president of the Provincial Deputation of Málaga (1971–1975), a member of the Congress of Deputies (1977–1982) and Senate (2011–2014).

Early life and career
Born in Málaga, De la Torre graduated in Sociology from the Pontifical University of Salamanca, earned a doctorate in Agronomic Engineering from the University of Madrid, and graduated in Regional Development from the University of Rennes in France. In 1971, aged 28, he was appointed president of the Provincial Deputation of Málaga under the Francoist dictatorship, and was dismissed in 1975 due to his liberal views.

In 1977, in the first democratic elections after the end of the dictatorship, De la Torre was elected to the Congress of Deputies for the Union of the Democratic Centre, where he remained until 1982. From May 1978 to June 1979 he was Advisor for Economy and Finance in the nascent Junta of Andalusia.

Mayor of Málaga
In 1995, De la Torre, by then an independent politician, was elected to Málaga's city council as second on the People's Party list, and joined the party the following year. Mayor Celia Villalobos made him first deputy mayor, government spokesperson and Councillor responsible for City Planning, Housing, Projects, Territorial Development and Transport. Villalobos left in 2000 to become Minister of Health, and De la Torre became mayor.

In the 2011 general election, De la Torre returned to the Cortes Generales for the first time in 29 years as the Senate candidate in Málaga with the most votes (341,850). He quit this post in June 2014 to concentrate on the upcoming mayoral elections.

De la Torre's party retained their majority in Málaga city hall in 2003, 2007 and 2011, but in 2015 they had to form a coalition with Citizens; this result still made him the PP mayor of the largest city; he blamed national corruption scandals for the party's decline in popularity.

De la Torre suffered a stroke in April 2020. After a month in hospital, he returned to work. Later in May, he marked 20 years as mayor. An article in La Opinión de Málaga was mostly positive on his two decades, apart from some expensive failed projects such as the Museum of Gems, and sanitation worker strikes.

In September 2022, De la Torre announced that he would stand for mayor for the sixth time in the May 2023 elections, by which time he would be 80.

Honours
In October 2017, De la Torre was awarded the National Order of the Legion of Honour on the 50th anniversary of Málaga's French community organisation. In November 2018, President of Russia Vladimir Putin made him the first Spanish recipient of the Medal of Pushkin, for having opened museums of Russian art in the city. After the Russian invasion of Ukraine in 2022, he faced calls to return the medal and close the museum.

In September 2021, he was appointed Honorary Officer of the Order of the British Empire (OBE), for services to bilateral relations between Málaga and the UK.

References

1942 births
Living people
People from Málaga
Pontifical University of Salamanca alumni
Complutense University of Madrid alumni
University of Rennes alumni
Union of the Democratic Centre (Spain) politicians
People's Party (Spain) politicians
Members of the 1st Congress of Deputies (Spain)
Members of the 10th Senate of Spain
Mayors of places in Andalusia
Officiers of the Légion d'honneur
Recipients of the Medal of Pushkin
Honorary Officers of the Order of the British Empire